Peter Runggaldier (born 29 December 1968 in Brixen and living in Sëlva, South Tyrol) is an Italian former Alpine skier, who specialized in downhill and super-G disciplines. He competed at the 1994 Winter Olympics and the 1998 Winter Olympics.

Biography
Born in Sëlva, Italy, he won two World Cup races, as well as the Super-G World Cup in 1995. Today he controls the "Competition centre" of the Ski School of Selva.

World Cup victories

See also
 Italian skiers most successful race winner

References

External links
 

1968 births
Living people
People from Sëlva
Sportspeople from Brixen
Italian male alpine skiers
Ladin people
FIS Alpine Ski World Cup champions
Alpine skiers of Fiamme Gialle
Olympic alpine skiers of Italy
Alpine skiers at the 1994 Winter Olympics
Alpine skiers at the 1998 Winter Olympics